Histoire de Belgique (French) is a seven-volume survey of the Belgian history by the historian Henri Pirenne (1862–1935) written in French and published between 1900 and 1932. The series, which traces the emergence of the Belgian nation-state from the Roman era until the start of World War I, is a classic of nationalist historiography and one of Pirenne's major works. Although Pirenne is today best known as a historian of Medieval Europe, the Histoire de Belgique series was his most respected work during his lifetime and the foundation of his reputation as Belgium's leading public historian.

Argument and reception
Unlike much nationalist historiography, Pirenne's history did not trace the emergence of a "Volksgeist" (national spirit) but argued that Belgium had developed naturally as a cosmopolitan society to serve as a mediator between Latin and Germanic Europe. Pirenne did, however, believe in the existence of a distinctly "Belgian civilisation" (civilisation belge) reflecting a unique combination of external influences and which had changed over time without losing its distinctiveness, significantly pre-dating Belgium's independence in 1830. He sought to evidence this argument by examining the history of Belgium since the Roman era.

Histoire de Belgique received widespread popular acclaim within Belgium, transcending political differences between Liberals and Catholics. According to the historian Ernst Kossmann:

Publication began in 1900 and ended in 1932 after being disrupted for several years during the German occupation of Belgium (1914–18) in which Pirenne had been held as a political prisoner. The seventh volume was awarded the Francqui Prize in 1933. According to modern historians, Pirenne's 1928 publication La Belgique et la Guerre Mondiale (Belgium and the World War) could be considered a chronological sequel, covering the period after the end of volume seven.

The series appeared in Dutch (Geschiedenis van België) and, encouraged by Pirenne's friend Karl Lamprecht, in German (Geschichte Belgiens) before World War I. Indeed, the first volume of the German translation was first published in 1899, before the appearance of the original French version in print. It has never been translated into English.

Volumes
The series' seven volumes are entitled:

The series was followed by Pirenne's final and most influential work, Mohammed and Charlemagne (Mahomet et Charlemagne), which put forward the so-called "Pirenne thesis" on the end of the ancient world and the emergence of the Middle Ages.

References

Footnotes

Bibliography

External links
Full text available at Internet Archive

History books about Belgium
1900 non-fiction books
1902 non-fiction books
1907 non-fiction books
1911 non-fiction books
1921 non-fiction books
1926 non-fiction books
1932 non-fiction books
National histories
1900 establishments in Belgium